Seoul American High School often abbreviated as SAHS was a secondary school in Yongsan Garrison, Seoul, South Korea operated by the Department of Defense Education Activity (DODEA).

The school was part of the Pacific West District of the Department of Defense Education Activity (DODEA) until 2019 when the school closed.

History 
Seoul American High School was established in 1959 to provide education for military and civilian families that were assigned to Yongsan Garrison. 150 students attended the school in the first school year (1959–1960). At its peak, the school had 600 students. 146 students attended the school in its last school year (2018–2019).

Closure 
In 2019, Seoul American High School officially closed after 60 years. Due to the relocation of United States Forces Korea to Camp Humphreys, the school lost a significant amount of its student body which led to the closure.

References 

Schools in Seoul